The Chevy Chase Show was an American late night talk show hosted by actor and comedian Chevy Chase that aired in 1993 on Fox. The series was canceled after five weeks on the air.

History

Creation and pre-production
In 1993, Fox asked country musician Dolly Parton to host a new-late night program. It would be the network's first since the October 1988 cancellation of The Late Show, originally hosted by Joan Rivers and later by Arsenio Hall and Ross Shafer. Parton turned the network down, and suggested Chase for the job. Chase reportedly signed a $3 million deal with Fox. To clear room for the new show, Fox cancelled Studs, a game show that had been in the late-night slot.

Fox spent $1 million to renovate the Aquarius Theater, the Los Angeles venue where the show would be recorded. Days before the show's premiere, the theater's name was changed to the Chevy Chase Theater.

Formula and trademarks
The Chevy Chase Show was one of several late-night talk shows that various networks aired about a year after Johnny Carson retired from hosting NBC's highly successful The Tonight Show. The show premiered on September 7, 1993, a week after the first Late Show with David Letterman and a week before the first Late Night with Conan O'Brien. In keeping with the formula Carson and David Letterman had established, the show featured a house band that Chase called the best band in the world: the Tom Scott-led MBC Orchestra (which would later be called The Hollywood Express). Like several other late-night shows (the most notable exception being the Jay Leno-hosted Tonight Show), the host secured ownership rights to his show; Chase produced it through his company, Cornelius Productions. The show's set featured a tank with live fish (visible during interviews), basketball hoops, and shelves of toys, as well as a desk with a built-in piano.

The program's lead-in featured a clay-animated Chase stealing letters from notable Los Angeles landmarks to spell the name of his show. As the credits rolled at the end of each episode, Chase was seen shooting basketballs at an onstage backstop.

Episodes
According to newspaper listings, Chase's guests during the 29-episode run included:

Week of September 6, 1993: Goldie Hawn, Whoopi Goldberg, Jason Priestley, Harry Anderson, Martin Short, Kathleen Turner, Robert Townsend
Week of September 13, 1993: Tom Selleck, Dennis Hopper, Anita Morris, Jennie Garth, Garrett Morris, Al Franken
Week of September 20, 1993: Deborah Allen, Rita Rudner, Engelbert Humperdinck, Billie Jean King, Chris Evert, Sinbad, Janis Ian, Robert De Niro, Kenny Loggins, Dean Cain
Week of September 27, 1993: Ron Silver, Jonathan Frakes, Sam Elliott, Pamela Anderson, Jamie Lee Curtis, Henry Rollins
Week of October 4, 1993: Dan Aykroyd, Lauren Tom, Dave Thomas, Queen Latifah, Doug E. Doug, Bill Nye, Joe Queenan, Michael Damian, Valerie Bertinelli, Taylor Dayne
Week of October 11, 1993: Canadian Brass, Burt Reynolds, Dan Fogelberg, Maria McKee, A Martinez, Martin Sheen, Alexandra Paul, Jim Varney
Guests slated for October 18, 1993: Elizabeth Ashley, Don Rickles

Reviews
Television critic Ken Tucker of Entertainment Weekly gave the show an F late in its run in 1993. Tucker noted that "the audience that fills Hollywood's new Chevy Chase Theatre has steadily turned into the worst-behaved crowd in late-night television; they hoot and yell and cheer over whatever pitiful chatter Chase is attempting to wring out of a luckless guest." In another review, Time panned the show: "Nervous and totally at sea, Chase tried everything, succeeded at nothing." The magazine criticized Chase for having "recycled old material shamelessly," taking pratfalls, and even pleading with the audience to stand up and dance in their seats.

Cancellation
Advertisers had been promised that the show would bring between five and six million viewers nightly. By contrast, Late Show with David Letterman guaranteed fewer than four million viewers to their advertisers. The Chevy Chase Show'''s actual ratings were much lower, averaging fewer than three million viewers. Fewer than two million people tuned in during the show's final weeks.

Lucie Salhany, the then-chairwoman of Fox Broadcasting, announced on October 17, 1993, that the network had decided to cancel the show "in the best interests of both its affiliated stations and its star." Salhany spoke about Chase's first episodes: "He was very nervous. It was uncomfortable and embarrassing to watch it." Chase issued a statement regarding the cancellation, in which he called the talk-show format "very constraining" and promoted his upcoming film, Cops and Robbersons. Chase had never intended the show to be a long-term series, even if it had been successful, and admitted in an interview that he would "never be tied down for five years interviewing TV personalities."

Although Fox dropped the show after four weeks, it ran for a week after the cancellation announcement. The entire last week was dedicated to making light of the show's "success". Within 48 hours of the final show, workmen had already dismantled and painted over the Chevy Chase Theater's sign. The theater was later renamed the Nickelodeon on Sunset, which remained its name until the theatre closed in 2017. Fox ran reruns of In Living Color in the former time slot of The Chevy Chase Show after the cancellation. In November 1993, Fox was in talks with Howard Stern to replace Chase's show, but the talks went nowhere. With the exceptions of talking with Stern and attempting to sign Conan O'Brien in the early 2000s, Fox has not attempted to air late-night network programming on weeknights since The Chevy Chase Show left the air, opting to give the 11:00p.m.midnight time slot back to its affiliates, some of whom use at least part of that time to air extensions of their 10:00p.m. local newscasts.

In a 2007 interview with Time, Chase spoke of the show, saying that it was "an entirely different concept than what was pushed on me. I would never do it again. What I wanted had a whole different feel to it, much darker and more improv. But we never got there." In an A&E Biography on Chase in 2009, Chase explained that because he had signed a contract with Fox, he was obligated to do the show the way the network wanted. During an interview on Norm Macdonald Has a Show, Chase reiterated his dislike of the experience, noting that the only thing he liked about the program was interviewing Robert De Niro.

In 2002, TV Guide ranked the show number 16 on its TV Guide's 50 Worst TV Shows of All Time list, and in 2010, TV Guide Network listed the show at No. 16 on their list of 25 Biggest TV Blunders alongside The Megan Mullally Show''.

References

External links
 

1993 American television series debuts
1993 American television series endings
1990s American late-night television series
1990s American television talk shows
English-language television shows
Fox late-night programming
Television series by 20th Century Fox Television